Insurgency in Macedonia may refer to:
National Liberation War of Macedonia
Insurgency in Macedonia (2001)